Denis Martin Tapsoba (6 July 1916 − 13 March 2008) was a Burkinabé Roman Catholic bishop.

Ordained to the priesthood on 6 May 1944, Tapsoba was named bishop of Roman Catholic Diocese of Ouahigouya, Burkina Faso on 15 March 1966 and resigned on 8 November 1984.

References 

1916 births
2008 deaths
People from Ouagadougou
20th-century Roman Catholic bishops in Burkina Faso
Roman Catholic bishops of Ouahigouya